Monsters of Folk was an American supergroup, consisting of Jim James from My Morning Jacket, Conor Oberst and Mike Mogis from Bright Eyes, Will Johnson from Centro-matic and M. Ward, solo artist and half of She & Him. The band was formed in 2004 when the members were on tour with their respective bands and solo projects. After playing together both on-stage and backstage, they started working together on various material. Due to the members' main projects, Monsters of Folk did not finish their first album until 2009, and it was released on September 22 on Rough Trade.
It debuted at No. 143 on the Billboard 200 and peaked at 15.
It also reached No. 3 on Top Independent Albums, No. 8 on Top Rock Albums, No. 7 on Top Digital Albums, and No. 6 on Top Alternative Albums.

Their song "Baby Boomer" was chosen as the Starbucks iTunes Pick of the Week for October 27, 2009.

On October 23 and 24, 2009, they performed at Neil Young's 23rd annual Bridge School Benefit held in Mountain View, California, at the Shoreline Amphitheater.

During live performances, Will Johnson is the performing drummer. In the band's appearance on Austin City Limits, James declared him as "the fifth Monster".

M. Ward has stated that there is more to come after Monsters of Folk's first album.

"His Master's Voice”, the closing track of their self-titled album, is featured in the soundtrack in the film Three Billboards Outside Ebbing, Missouri. Other appearances in media include “Map of the World”, the thirteenth track of the aforementioned album, which was featured in the CW teen drama Gossip Girl.

Discography

Album

Singles

Band members
Jim James – vocals, guitar, bass, drums, percussion, keyboards
Mike Mogis – guitar, keyboards, backing vocals, pedal steel, mandolin, dobro, bass, drums, percussion
Conor Oberst – vocals, guitar, bass, drums, percussion, keyboards, piano
M. Ward – vocals, guitar, bass, piano

Touring
Will Johnson – drums, backing vocals

See also
New Multitudes

References

External links

Conor Oberst
Folk music supergroups
American folk rock groups
American indie rock groups
Musical groups established in 2004
Musical groups disestablished in 2010
Rough Trade Records artists
Musical quintets